Bagno (German: Bruchdorf) is a village in the administrative district of Gmina Sława, within Wschowa County, Lubusz Voivodeship, in western Poland.

The village has a population of 224.

References

Bagno